Gasim Mirza was the self-declared Shah of Shirvan after the death of Gurban Ali.

Life 
He was a member of the Shirvanshahs. He escaped to the Ottoman Empire via the Dagestan-Taman-Kaffa route. He participated in the Third Campaign of the Ottoman–Safavid War, and led an army of exiles and Turks to Shirvan in 1554. Despite a few victories, he lost the final battle and fled to Dagestan. His fate is unknown.

References

Sources
 

Year of birth unknown
16th-century Iranian military personnel
Iranian emigrants to the Ottoman Empire